Mitchelstown GAA is a Gaelic Athletic Association based in the town of Mitchelstown, Cork, Ireland. The club fields teams in competitions organized by the Cork GAA county board and the Avondhu GAA divisional board. The club plays only Gaelic football.

History
In 1887 the first G.A.A. club was formed in Mitchelstown under the name of the Blacthorns. Early in the nineteen hundreds the name was changed to the Kangaroos. The club did not meet with much success until it won the Cork Intermediate Football Championship in 1929. In the 1930s, 40s and 50s Mitchelstown won many North Cork Championships but never succeeded in winning a County Championship until 1961 when Mitchelstown, by which name the club was then known, won the Cork Junior Football Championship the same year for the first time. Mitchelstown also won the Cork Intermediate Football Championship in 1965. On 10 November 2013 Mitchelstown defeated St. Colum's of Kealkill to win their first Cork County JAFC title in 52 years at Páirc Uí Rinn with a scoreline of 0-12 to 2-4.

Achievements
 Cork Intermediate Football Championship Winners (4) 1911, 1925, 1929, 1965
  Cork Junior Football Championship Winners (2) 1961, 2013 Runners-Up 1928, 1955, 1957, 1958, 1960, 1973, 2011
 Cork Minor Football Championship Winners (1) 1960  Runners-Up 1959, 1961, 1975, 1976, 2016
 North Cork Junior A Football Championship Winners (24) 1928, 1934, 1935, 1937, 1939, 1940, 1943, 1944, 1947, 1948, 1951, 1955, 1956, 1957, 1958, 1960, 1961, 1969, 1972, 1973, 1975, 1995, 2001, 2002, 2010, 2011, 2013  Runners-Up 1930, 1931, 1953, 1988, 1991, 2000, 2003, 2012

References

External links
Official website

Gaelic games clubs in County Cork
Gaelic football clubs in County Cork